The Czech Republic competed at the 1996 Summer Olympics in Atlanta, United States. It was the first Summer Games since the dissolution of Czechoslovakia, and so the Czech Republic and Slovakia competed as independent teams. 115 competitors, 76 men and 39 women, took part in 110 events in 17 sports.

Medalists

Athletics

Men's 800 metres
Pavel Soukup

Men's 110 metres hurdles
Tomáš Dvořák

Men's 20 kilometres Walk
Jiří Malysa
Tomáš Kratochvíl
Hubert Sonnek

Men's 50 km Walk
Miloš Holuša — 4:03:16 (→ 27th place)
Hubert Sonnek — did not finish (→ no ranking)

Men's High Jump
 Tomáš Janků

Men's Long Jump
 Milan Gombala
 Qualification — 7.88m (→ did not advance)

Men's Shot Put
Miroslav Menc

Men's Discus Throw 
 Marek Bílek
 Qualification — 59.86m (→ did not advance)

Men's Hammer Throw 
 Pavel Sedláček
 Qualification — 73.98m (→ did not advance)

Men's Javelin Throw
Jan Železný

Men's Decathlon 
 Tomáš Dvořák 
 Final Result — 8664 points (→  Bronze Medal)
 Robert Změlík 
 Final Result — 8422 points (→ 7th place)
 Kamil Damašek 
 Final Result — 8229 points (→ 16th place)

Women's 400 metres
 Hana Benešová
 Helena Fuchsová
 Naděžda Koštovalová

Women's 800 metres
 Ludmila Formanová

Women's 4 × 400 metres Relay 
 Naděžda Koštovalová, Ludmila Formanová, Helena Fuchsová, and Hana Benešová
 Qualification — 3:26.82
 Final — 3:26.99 (→ 7th place)

Women's High Jump
 Zuzana Kováčiková
 Qualification — 1.93m
 Final — 1.93m (→ 12th place)

Women's Javelin Throw
 Nikola Tomečková
 Qualification — 55.02m (→ did not advance)

Women's Discus Throw 
 Zdeňka Šilhavá 
 Qualification — 59.24m (→ did not advance)
 Alice Matějková 
 Qualification — 60.72m (→ did not advance)

Women's Triple Jump
 Šárka Kašpárková
 Qualification — 14.42m 
 Final — 14.98m (→  Bronze Medal)

Beach volleyball

Marek Pakosta and Michal Palinek — 13th place overall

Boxing

Men's Lightweight (– 60 kg)
Jaroslav Konečný
 First Round — Defeated Idrissa Kabore (Burkina Faso), 16-6 
 Second Round — Lost to Pongsith Wiangwiset (Thailand), 6-20

Men's Light Middleweight (– 71 kg)
Pavol Polakovič
 First Round — Defeated Victor Kunene (South Africa), 8-1 
 Second Round — Lost to David Reid (United States), 5-12

Men's Middleweight (– 75 kg)
Ľudovít Plachetka
 First Round — Defeated Dan Mathunjawa (Swaziland), 20-4 
 Second Round — Lost to Dilshod Yarbekov (Uzbekistan), 4-4 (referee decision)

Men's Super Heavyweight (+ 91 kg)
Petr Horáček
 First Round — Lost to Adaliat Marnedov (Azerbaijan), RSC-2 (01:10)

Canoeing

Men's Kayak Doubles, 500 metres
Karel Leština and Jiří Polívka

Men's Kayak Doubles, 1,000 metres
Petr Hruška and René Kučera

Men's Kayak Fours, 1,000 metres
Karel Leština, Pavel Mráz, Martin Otáhal, and Jiří Polívka

Men's Kayak Singles, Slalom
Luboš Hilgert
Jiří Prskavec

Men's Canadian Singles, 500 metres
Martin Doktor

Men's Canadian Singles, 1,000 metres
Martin Doktor

Men's Canadian Doubles, 500 metres
Pavel Bednář and Petr Fuksa

Men's Canadian Doubles, 1,000 metres
Pavel Bednář and Petr Fuksa

Men's Canadian Singles, Slalom
Lukáš Pollert
Pavel Janda

Men's Canadian Doubles, Slalom
Miroslav Šimek and Jiří Rohan
Petr Štercl and Pavel Štercl

Women's Kayak Singles, 500 metres
Pavlína Jobánková

Women's Kayak Doubles, 500 metres
Jitka Janáčková and Pavlína Jobánková

Women's Kayak Fours, 500 metres
Jitka Janáčková, Kateřina Heková, Kateřina Hluchá, and Milena Pergnerová

Women's Kayak Singles, Slalom
Štěpánka Hilgertová
Marcela Sadilová
Irena Pavelková

Cycling

Road
Men's individual road race
 Ján Svorada

Track
Men's sprint
 Pavel Buráň

Mountain bike
Men's cross-country
 Radovan Fořt
 Final — 2:42:43 (→ 24th place)
 Pavel Camrda
 Final — 2:49:09 (→ 33rd place)

Women's cross-country
 Kateřina Neumannová
 Final — 2:04.03 (→ 18th place)
 Kateřina Hanušová
 Final — 2:04.05 (→ 19th place)

Fencing

One male fencer represented the Czech Republic in 1996.

Men's épée
 Roman Ječmínek

Gymnastics

Judo

Rhythmic gymnastics

Rowing

The Czech Republic had five rowers participate in three out of fourteen rowing events in 1996.
 Men's single sculls
 Václav Chalupa

 Men's lightweight double sculls
 Michal Vabroušek
 Adam Michálek

 Women's coxless pair
 Sabina Telenská
 Hana Dariusová

Sailing

Shooting

Swimming

Men's 100m Backstroke
 Rastislav Bizub
 Heat — 58.29 (→ did not advance, 39th place)

Men's 200m Backstroke
 Rastislav Bizub
 Heat — 2:04.55 (→ did not advance, 24th place)

Men's 100m Breaststroke
 Daniel Málek
 Heat — 1:02.46
 B-Final — 1:02.39 (→ 10th place)

Men's 200m Breaststroke
 Daniel Málek
 Heat — 2:17.08 (→ did not advance, 17th place)

Men's 200m Butterfly
 Josef Horký
 Heat — 2:02.84 (→ did not advance, 30th place)

Men's 200m Individual Medley
 Josef Horký
 Heat — 2:05.45 (→ did not advance, 18th place)

Men's 400m Individual Medley
 Josef Horký
 Heat — 4:26.58
 B-Final — 4:28.39 (→ 14th place)

Women's 100m Freestyle
 Kristýna Kyněrová
 Heat — 58.03 (→ did not advance, 34th place)

Women's 200m Freestyle
 Kristýna Kyněrová
 Heat — 2:03.63 (→ did not advance, 19th place)

Women's 400m Freestyle
 Olga Šplíchalová
 Heat — 4:20.04 (→ did not advance, 21st place)

Women's 800m Freestyle
 Olga Šplíchalová
 Heat — 8:47.68 (→ did not advance, 15th place)

Women's 100m Backstroke
 Marcela Kubalčíková
 Heat — 1:05.48 (→ did not advance, 24th place)

Women's 200m Backstroke
 Kateřina Pivoňková
 Heat — 2:18.20 (→ did not advance, 21st place)

Women's 100m Breaststroke
 Lenka Maňhalová
 Heat — 1:12.72 (→ did not advance, 29th place)

Women's 200m Breaststroke
 Lenka Maňhalová
 Heat — 2:32.14
 B-Final — 2:29.96 (→ 16th place)

Women's 100m Butterfly
 Marcela Kubalčíková
 Heat — 1:03.82 (→ did not advance, 32nd place)

Women's 200m Butterfly
 Marcela Kubalčíková
 Heat — 2:19.38 (→ did not advance, 27th place)

Women's 200m Individual Medley
 Lenka Maňhalová
 Heat — 2:18.43 (→ did not advance, 20th place)

Women's 400m Individual Medley
 Pavla Chrástová
 Heat — 4:51.35
 B-Final — 4:56.23 (→ 16th place)
 Hana Černá
 Heat — 4:49.43
 B-Final — 4:46.78 (→ 10th place)

Women's 4 × 200 m Freestyle Relay
 Hana Černá, Kristýna Kyněrová, Pavla Chrástová, and Olga Šplíchalová
 Heat — 8:21.19 (→ did not advance, 15th place)

Women's 4 × 100 m Medley Relay
 Kateřina Pivoňková, Lenka Maňhalová, Marcela Kubalčíková, and Kristýna Kyněrová
 Heat — 4:21.05 (→ did not advance, 20th place)

Table tennis

Tennis

Men's Singles Competition
 Jiří Novák
 First round — Lost to Renzo Furlan (Italy) 6-4 4-6 3-6
 Daniel Vacek
 First round — Defeated David Prinosil (Germany) 6-4 2-6 6-4
 Second round — Lost to Andrei Olhovskiy (Russia) 3-6 6-7

Weightlifting

Wrestling

References

Nations at the 1996 Summer Olympics
1996 Summer Olympics
1996 in Czech sport